Gaggia is an Italian manufacturer of coffee machines, especially espresso machine, in addition to small kitchen appliances. The company is owned by Saeco.

History
The founder, Giovanni Achille Gaggia (1895–1961), applied for a patent (patent number 365726) for the first modern steamless coffee machine on 5 September 1938, to be used commercially in his coffee bar. The machine forced water to flow over the coffee grounds at a high pressure, producing the 'crema' that is unique to espresso.

The Gaggia company was founded in 1947 and formally incorporated in 1948. It first produced machines for commercial use, but shortly thereafter released the Gilda, its first home machine.

Success comes when the Motta & Biffi bar in Galleria Vittorio Emanuele, in Milan, installs the Gaggia machine: there is a queue among the customers. Initially the coffee machines produced by Gaggia were exclusively for professional use, in 1977 the production was expanded to coffee machines for domestic use. Giovanni's son, Camillo, with his partner Armando Migliorini, expands the business on the Navigli but encounters economic difficulties. In 1989 the company, which has a turnover of over 56 billion lire, changes ownership and is sold to the Austro-American businessman Gerhard Andlingler.

Gaggia has four product lines. They market automatic espresso machines, manual espresso machines, accessories, and coffee beans under the Gaggia brand name. The company continues to produce espresso machines (as well as accessories) from classic manual machines to the innovative semi-automatic and super-automatic models recently added to the line.

In 2007 the Milanese company went into crisis due to a drop in sales, with the risk of closing the Robecco plant and moving production to Romania and Gaggio Montano. Two years later, Gaggia follows the fate of its parent company Saeco, which is taken over by the Dutch multinational Philips.

As of 2010, all Gaggia espresso and coffee machines are still manufactured in Milan at the Robecco Sul Naviglio factory. The 2015 Gaggia Classic was built in Romania instead. The New Gaggia Classic is made in Italy again and uses an aluminum boiler.

The Gaggia S.p. A company was purchased in 1999 by fellow Italian competitor Saeco International Group, which in turn was purchased by Dutch manufacturer Philips in 2009. Gaggia still operates a separate line but now is using Saeco designs in some of its domestic espresso machines.
Before the takeover by Philips most domestic espresso machines from Gaggia had aluminium boilers. Now they have stainless steel boilers.

In 2017 Philips sold the Saeco Professional  division (also with the Gaggia brand) to N&W Global Vending SpA, an Italian Bergamo based company leader in vending machines for drinks and snacks, born in 2000 from the integration of Necta and Wittenborg and controlled by a US fund, Lone Star. The domestic coffee machine division remains in the Philips group. In November 2017 N&W changes its name to Evoca Group.

See also 

 Bialetti
 De'Longhi
 Faema
 FrancisFrancis
 La Marzocco
 Rancilio
 List of Italian companies

References

External links

Espresso machines
Coffee appliance vendors
Home appliance brands
Home appliance manufacturers of Italy
Manufacturing companies established in 1947
Italian companies established in 1947
Italian brands
Coffee in Italy
Saeco